Óscar Gibram Manzanarez Pérez (born 24 April 1995) is a Mexican professional footballer who plays as a defender for Liga MX club Santos Laguna.

Career statistics

Club

Honours
Tampico Madero
Liga de Expansión MX: Guardianes 2020

References

External links
 
 
 

1995 births
Living people
Mexican footballers
Association football defenders
C.D. Malacateco players
Santos Laguna footballers
Tampico Madero F.C. footballers
Ascenso MX players
Liga MX players
Liga de Expansión MX players
Liga Nacional de Fútbol de Guatemala players
Liga Premier de México players
Tercera División de México players
Footballers from Baja California
People from Ensenada, Baja California